Edmund Majowski (12 November 1910 – 26 October 1982) was a Polish football player and coach.

Playing career
Majowski, who played as a striker, spent his professional career in both Poland and Austria, playing for AKS Chorzów, Pogoń Lwów and Admira Vienna.

Majowski also represented Poland at international level, scoring one goal in four games between 1933 and 1934.

Coaching career
Majowski managed the Norwegian national team between 1957 and 1958.

References

1910 births
1982 deaths
Polish footballers
Poland international footballers
Polish football managers
Polish expatriate football managers
Norway national football team managers
Sportspeople from Chorzów
Kuwait national football team managers
Pogoń Lwów players
Polish expatriate footballers
Expatriate footballers in Austria
Expatriate football managers in Norway
Expatriate football managers in Kuwait
People from the Province of Silesia
Association football forwards
Polish expatriate sportspeople in Kuwait
Polish expatriate sportspeople in Norway
AKS Chorzów players
FC Admira Wacker Mödling players